Nightmare Ending is the seventh studio album from Portland, Oregon ambient musician Matthew Robert Cooper, under the name Eluvium. It is a double-album and was released on May 14, 2013. The album’s final track, “Happiness”, features vocals by Ira Kaplan of the band Yo La Tengo. A special digital edition, featuring a print by artist Jeannie Paske, was released on May 1, 2013, limited to 300 copies.

Track listing
Disc 1
 "Don't Get Any Closer" – 9:06
 "Warm" – 7:10
 "By the Rails" – 2:15
 "Unknown Variation" – 8:42
 "Caroling" – 3:54
 "Sleeper" – 6:17
 "Envenom Mettle" – 5:23

Disc 2
 "Chime" – 3:26
 "Rain Gently" – 8:49
 "Impromptu (For the Procession)" – 4:01
 "Covered in Writing" – 9:18
 "Entendre" – 4:20
 "Strange Arrivals" – 2:50
 "Happiness" (ft. Ira Kaplan) – 8:16

References

2013 albums
Eluvium (musician) albums
Temporary Residence Limited albums